The Boundary Ranges, also known in the singular and as the Alaska Boundary Range, are the largest and most northerly subrange of the Coast Mountains.  They begin at the Nass River, near the southern end of the Alaska Panhandle in the Canadian province of British Columbia and run to the Kelsall River, near the Chilkoot Pass, beyond which are the Alsek Ranges of the Saint Elias Mountains, and northwards into the Yukon Territory flanking the west side of the Yukon River drainage as far as Champagne Pass, north of which being the Yukon Ranges.  To their east are the Skeena Mountains and Stikine Plateau of the Interior Mountains complex that lies northwest of the Interior Plateau; the immediately adjoining subregion of the Stikine Plateau is the Tahltan Highland.  To their northeast is the Tagish Highland, which is a subregion of the Yukon Plateau.  Both highlands are considered in some descriptions as included in the Coast Mountains.  The Alexander Archipelago lies offshore and is entirely within Alaska.

The Boundary Ranges include several large icefields, including the Juneau Icefield, between the Alaskan city of the same name and Atlin Lake in B.C.; and the Stikine Icecap, which lies between the lower Stikine River and the Whiting River. Some of the highest mountains in the Boundary Ranges are: Mount Ratz, ; Chutine Peak, ; and Devils Thumb, all in the Stikine Icecap region; and Devils Paw, in the Juneau Icefield.

Despite the height of Mount Ratz and its neighbours, most of the Boundary Ranges are considerably lower than the Pacific Ranges of the southern Coast Mountains.  The larger icefields of the Boundary Ranges are at a much lower elevation than their southern counterparts in the Pacific Ranges because of the difference in latitude.

Physiographically, they are a section of the larger Pacific Border province, which in turn is part of the larger Pacific Mountain System physiographic division.

The granitic intrusions that form the Boundary Ranges are remnants of a Late Cretaceous volcanic arc system called the Coast Range Arc.

Subranges

Boundary Range
Cheja Range
Chechidla Range
Chutine Icefield
Adam Mountains
Ashington Range
Burniston Range
Dezadeash Range
Florence Range
Halleck Range
Juneau Icefield
Kahpo Mountains
Kakuhan Range
Lincoln Mountains
Longview Range
Peabody Mountains
Rousseau Range
Seward Mountains
Snowslide Range
Spectrum Range
Stikine Icecap

Rivers
Rivers draining or transiting the Boundary Ranges include the:

Chilkat River
Choquette River
Craig River
Iskut River
Kelsall River
Keta River
King Salmon Creek
Klehini River
Lava Fork
Nass River
Porcupine River
Salmon River
Skagway River
Stikine River
Taiya River
Taku River
Tulsequah River
Unuk River
Whiting River

See also 

List of Boundary Peaks of the Alaska-British Columbia/Yukon border

References
S. Holland, Landforms of British Columbia, Province of British Columbia, 1976, pp 38-39
map from Bulletin 48: Landforms of British Columbia

External links
Boundary Ranges of the Canadian Mountain Encyclopedia

 
Mountain ranges of British Columbia
Coast Mountains
Physiographic sections